Sarcolaena oblongifolia is a species of plant in the Sarcolaenaceae family. It is endemic to Madagascar.  Its natural habitats are subtropical or tropical moist lowland forests and subtropical or tropical moist shrubland. It is threatened by habitat loss.

References

Endemic flora of Madagascar
oblongifolia
Least concern plants
Taxonomy articles created by Polbot
Flora of the Madagascar subhumid forests